This article contains a list of the most studied restriction enzymes whose names start with C to D inclusive. It contains approximately 80 enzymes.

The following information is given:



Whole list navigation

Restriction enzymes

C

D

Notes

Biotechnology
Restriction enzyme cutting sites
Restriction enzymes